Feline Fuelled Games is a German PC game development team whose mods for the role-playing games Neverwinter Nights 2 by Obsidian and Dragon Age: Origins by BioWare have received critical acclaim in the German video game press. On 5 May 2017, they will publish their first original game, the point-and-click adventure Sandra and Woo in the Cursed Adventure based on the webcomic Sandra and Woo.

History

Before the Foundation 

Before Feline Fuelled Games was established in 2004, its founder Oliver Knörzer and several other team members, among them Eric Dunkel and Matthias Geißler, developed the campaign Silberwald: Der Ring des Schicksals (Silver Forest: The Ring of Destiny) for BioWare's Neverwinter Nights which was released on 21 July 2003. It became a surprise hit with more than 30,000 downloads at the biggest Neverwinter Nights fansite NWVault. Silberwald: Der Ring des Schicksals received an overall score of 78% in a test by Georg Valentin of the second biggest German game magazine GameStar, and it was the subject of the TV show Giga Games which aired on 25 July 2003.

Oliver's mother Ute Knörzer, who designed levels and wrote dialog for Silberwald: Der Ring des Schicksals, then moved on to develop the mods Silberwald Saga: Dunkle Sonne (Silver Forest Legend: Dark Sun), a spin-off of the original Silberwald campaign, and Das Lied der Götter for Neverwinter Nights. The latter one was later translated into English among the title The Song Divine and has been included into NWVault’s Hall of Fame list.

Mods for Neverwinter Nights 2 

After Neverwinter Nights 2 was announced by Obsidian, Oliver Knörzer and Ute Knörzer began the development of a new campaign called Gaia: Chroniken des 3. Zeitalters (Gaia: Chronicles of the Third Age) for it in 2004. Some old and new team members joined them over the course of 2004 and 2005 and the mod group was given its name Feline Fuelled Games on 29 September 2005, referring a story arc of the webcomic Dragon Tails about an incompetent video game developer company. The project turned out to be too ambitious, though, and was eventually cancelled in 2006 with Oliver Knörzer also resigning as lead developer. However, Feline Fuelled Games, now led by Ute Knörzer, managed to release several other mods during the next years and grew to 20 team members as of March 2012, including the second lead developer Walter Oswald. The release of a new mod, like the one of the fourth chapter of the Planescape: Die Traumfängerin series, is usually mentioned on German video game websites such as GameCaptain, Gamezone and Gameswelt.

Herz der Finsternis 

The first mod released by Feline Fuelled Games was Herz der Finsternis (Heart of Darkness) on 9 December 2007, which was developed by Ute Knörzer. Herz der Finsternis is the direct sequel of Das Lied der Götter and was praised by Andreas Bertits as "a fantastic adventure" that "no fan of the main game [Neverwinter Nights 2] and fantasy stories should miss" in his reviews of the campaign for the game magazines PC Games and PC Action.

Der Fluch der Zwerge series 

The release of Herz der Finsternis was followed by the release of the first part of the Der Fluch der Zwerge (The Curse of the Dwarfs) series by lead developer Walter Oswald on 5 March 2008. Until January 2011 five parts of the Der Fluch der Zwerge series have been published. Its second chapter has been described by Andreas Bertits of PC Games as "extensive and exciting adventure" and his colleague Marc Brehme wrote in his review of the first part of the third chapter that they (the PC Games team) were once again "convinced by the quality of the fan extension".

Planescape: Die Traumfängerin series 

After the release of Herz der Finsternis, Ute Knörzer began the development of the Planescape: Die Traumfängerin (Planescape: The Shaper of Dreams) series, her most ambitious project so far. The first chapter was released on 11 August 2008 and the sixth and last chapter on 30 August 2009. Planescape: Die Traumfängerin received the most critical acclaim of all mods developed by Feline Fuelled Games so far with Andreas Bertits of PC Games giving the following review of the second chapter: "The mod by Ute Knörzer will take you into a strange but fascinating world. The appealing story motivates to continue playing with lots of puzzles and twists. The varied and pretty areas, the game changing decisions, the many interesting non-player characters and the exciting fights create a unique gaming experience." The first three chapters of the campaign have also been translated into English and are listed as second highest rated mod on NWVault’s top mods list with a score of 9.91 as of May 2010.

Mods for Dragon Age: Origin

Synapsia 

On 17 July 2010, Feline Fuelled Games released Synapsia, their first mod for Dragon Age: Origins. It was rated as an "outstanding" mod in a review by Marc Brehme for PC Action. The humorous campaign is an extended version of the original mod for Neverwinter Nights 2 with the same title by Gabriele Schmied that was published on 12 December 2009.

Chroniken von Coldramar 

On 16 October 2011, Feline Fuelled Games released Chroniken von Coldramar (Chronicles of Coldramar), a campaign for Dragon Age: Origins centering on the adventures of three young barbarians. As Feline Fuelled Games' most advanced mod so far, Chroniken von Coldramar featured a full voice-over carried out by professional voice artists, custom music and almost 90 minutes of cutscenes. In his three-page review of the modification in PC Action, Mark Brehme concluded that it "turned out so well that it may likely pass as an add-on you have to pay for."

Sandra and Woo in the Cursed Adventure 

Since 2013, Feline Fuelled Games has been developing a point-and-click adventure based on Oliver Knörzer’s webcomic Sandra and Woo called Sandra and Woo in the Cursed Adventure. It’s the team’s first original game and uses the Adventure Game Engine by Visionaire Studio. The game will be published on 5 May 2017 on Steam in German and English and will feature a full voice-over.

List of released games

Mods

Original games

References

External links
 Feline Fuelled Games (official website)
 Feline Fuelled Games Forum
 Sandra and woo in the Cursed Adventure (official website)

Video game development companies
Video game companies of Germany